Carbohydrate-responsive element-binding protein (ChREBP) also known as MLX-interacting protein-like (MLXIPL) is a protein that in humans is encoded by the MLXIPL gene. The protein name derives from the protein's interaction with carbohydrate response element sequences of DNA.

Function 

This gene encodes a basic helix-loop-helix leucine zipper transcription factor of the Myc / Max / Mad superfamily. This protein forms a heterodimeric complex and binds and activates, in a glucose-dependent manner, carbohydrate response element (ChoRE) motifs in the promoters of triglyceride synthesis genes.

ChREBP is activated by glucose, independent of insulin. In adipose tissue, ChREBP induces de novo lipogenesis from glucose in response to a glucose flux into adipocytes. In the liver, glucose induction of ChREBP promotes glycolysis and lipogenesis.

Clinical significance 

This gene is deleted in Williams-Beuren syndrome, a multisystem developmental disorder caused by the deletion of contiguous genes at chromosome 7q11.23.

Excess expression of ChREBP in the liver due to metabolic syndrome or type 2 diabetes can lead to steatosis in the liver. In non-alcoholic fatty liver disease, about 25% of total liver lipids result from de novo synthesis (synthesis of lipids from glucose). High blood glucose and insulin enhance lipogenesis in the liver by activation of ChREBP and SREBP-1c, respectively.

Chronically elevated blood glucose can activate ChREBP in the pancreas can lead to excessive lipid synthesis in beta cells, increasing lipid accumulation in those cells, leading to lipotoxicity, beta-cell apoptosis, and type 2 diabetes.

Interactions 

MLXIPL has been shown to interact with MLX.

Role in glycolysis 

ChREBP is translocated to the nucleus and binds to DNA after dephosphorylation of a p-Ser and a p-Thr residue by PP2A, which itself is activated by Xylulose-5-phosphate. Xu5p is produced in the pentose phosphate pathway when levels of Glucose-6-phosphate are high (the cell has ample glucose). In the liver, ChREBP mediates activation of several regulatory enzymes of glycolysis and lipogenesis including L-type pyruvate kinase (L-PK), acetyl CoA carboxylase, and fatty acid synthase.

References

Further reading